Wong Chin Hung (born 2 March 1982 in Hong Kong) is a former Hong Kong professional football player who is currently the head coach of Hong Kong Premier League club Rangers.

He mostly played as a left back.

Club career

Instant-Dict
Wong Chin Hung played at hard grounds at lunchtime when he was a teenager. He enjoys having the ball at this feet. At 16, he accompanied a school friend to a trial at Instant-Dict FC's youth team. His father then received a call from the club wanting to recruit him.

Rangers
Wong Chin Hung only received a monthly salary of HK$1,500 at Rangers F.C.. He had to work in renovation to make ends meet and did not play for two months. But Philip Lee of Rangers asked him to come back to football. He was selected to play in the indoor 5-a-side Hong Kong team and regained his love for football.

Pegasus
Wong Chin Hung was loaned to TSW Pegasus by South China for the 2008–09 season. On 12 October 2008, Wong Chin Hung scored a hat-trick as a left back in the 8:0 win against Tuen Mun Progoal.

South China
In the 2010 AFC Cup, Wong Chin Hung came on as a substitute and scored the winner against Muangthong United in the final minute in an ill-tempered match which saw both sides reduced to 10 men. The win meant South China and Muangthong both have 10 points from five games. But the Hong Kong side have a better head-to-head record following their 0–0 draw in Hong Kong.

Rangers
On 11 January 2013, Wong Chin Hung made a return to his former club Biu Chun Rangers from South China as a free transfer. On the same day, Biu Chun Rangers defender Chak Ting Fung was transferred to South China. The two deals were regarded as a player exchange.

Wong Chin Hung was also appointed as the team captain right after he joined Biu Chun Rangers.

Eastern
He refused to extend the contract with Biu Chun Rangers and made a transfer list request after the end of the 2012–13 season. On 1 June 2013, Wong joined newly promoted First Division club Eastern Salon for free.

He retired prior to the 2017–18 season to become an assistant coach at Eastern.

International career

Hong Kong U-23
At the 2009 East Asian Games, Wong Chin Hung was selected into the Hong Kong U23 as an over-age player after Chak Ting Fung was injured. He managed one goal and two assists through his corner kicks in the tournament. He also scored the last penalty in the penalty shoot-out in the final against Japan.

Hong Kong
On 2 October 2011, Wong Chin Hung scored two goals for Hong Kong, one of them a re-taken penalty, in the 2011 Long Teng Cup game against Macau. Hong Kong won 5–1 in the end.

Personal life
Wong Chin Hung has had an uneasy relationship with his father, because he often injures himself and damages his footwear while playing football. His father once locked him up in their home to stop him from playing. He has also never attended any of his matches.

Honour

Club
South China
Hong Kong First Division: 2007–08, 2008–09, 2009–10
Hong Kong Senior Shield: 2009–10
Hong Kong FA Cup: 2010–11
HKFA League Cup: 2007–08, 2010–11

Eastern
Hong Kong First Division: 2015–16

Pegasus
Hong Kong Senior Shield: 2008–09

Individual
2009 East Asian Games Football Event: Gold

Career statistics

Club
As of 3 June 2011

International
As of 5 October 2011

References

External links
 Wong Chin Hung at HKFA

1982 births
Living people
Hong Kong footballers
Association football defenders
Hong Kong First Division League players
Hong Kong Premier League players
South China AA players
Hong Kong Rangers FC players
Eastern Sports Club footballers
Hong Kong international footballers